Adam Tuominen (born 22 January 1980) is an Australian actor best known for his role as Hunter Bradley, the Crimson Thunder Ranger in Power Rangers Ninja Storm.

Early life
Tuominen was born in Adelaide, South Australia, one of three children to Christine and Lauri Tuominen. He and his twin brother Sam have an older sister, Natalie. He is of Finnish and Lithuanian descent; his father was born in Finland. Tuominen attended St. Peter's College, Adelaide where he studied drama. Afterwards he went on to study drama and directing at Flinders University's Drama Centre. At Age 21, he graduated from the prestigious school National Institute of Dramatic Art in Sydney. He also studied martial arts for five years.

Personal life
Tuominen married Stephanie Horlin-Smith in 2018 in Adelaide, South Australia.

Acting career
In 2003, he joined the main cast of the American series Power Rangers Ninja Storm where he played Hunter Bradley until the end of the series. He reprised his role as Hunter in a guest appearance for two episodes of Power Rangers Dino Thunder in 2004. In 2006, he appeared as a guest in an episode of the series McLeod's Daughters where he played John Nostier, and in 2008, he appeared on stage in Melborn08's Playspotting at the La Mama Courthouse Theatre, where he played three different roles - A Cup of Sugar, The Trick and Lovely Bits. In 2011, he appeared in the 
mini-series Underbelly: Razor where he played the criminal and explosives expert Frank "Razor Jack" Hayes.

Filmography

Films

Theatre

Video games

Awards and nominations

References

External links
 
 

1980 births
21st-century Australian male actors
Australian male stage actors
Australian male television actors
Australian people of Finnish descent
Australian people of Lithuanian descent
Flinders University alumni
Living people
National Institute of Dramatic Art alumni